Majovskya is a genus of flowering plants belonging to the family Rosaceae. They are shrubs or small trees, they appear to have arisen via hybridization events between the clades Aria (Pers.) Host and Chamaemespilus (L.) Crantz.
 
It is native to Europe and found in Austria, Czechoslovakia, France, Germany, Poland, Spain and Switzerland.
Majovskya sudetica has also be found in Ukraine in 2020.

The genus name of Majovskya is in honour of Jozef Májovský (1920–2012), who was a Slovakian botanist and Professor of Botany in Bratislava. This was due to "the development of the taxonomy of hybridogenous Sorbus taxa in Slovakia". It was first described and published by Alexander Nikolaevitsch Sennikov and Arto Kurtto in Memoranda Soc. Fauna Fl. Fenn. vol.93 on page 63 in 2017.

The US Germplasm Resources Information Network calls Majovskya a synonym of ×Chamaearia , as while the name is legitimate, Majovskya is incorrect because ×Chamaearia should have priority (according to Shenzhen ICN 11.3).

Species
According to Kew:
Majovskya algoviensis 
Majovskya ambigua 
Majovskya haljamovae 
Majovskya sudetica 
Majovskya zuzanae 

The type species is Majovskya sudetica

References

Rosaceae
Rosaceae genera
Plants described in 2017
Flora of Southwestern Europe
Flora of Central Europe